Potassium carbonate is the inorganic compound with the formula K2CO3. It is a white salt, which is soluble in water and forms a strongly alkaline solution. It is deliquescent, often appearing as a damp or wet solid. Potassium carbonate is mainly used in the production of soap and glass.

History
Potassium carbonate is the primary component of potash and the more refined pearl ash or salts of tartar.  Historically, pearl ash was created by baking potash in a kiln to remove impurities.  The fine, white powder remaining was the pearl ash.  The first patent issued by the US Patent Office was awarded to Samuel Hopkins in 1790 for an improved method of making potash and pearl ash.

In late 18th-century North America, before the development of baking powder, pearl ash was used as a leavening agent for quick breads.

Production
Potassium carbonate is prepared commercially by the reaction of potassium hydroxide with carbon dioxide:
 2 KOH + CO2 → K2CO3 + H2O
From the solution crystallizes the sesquihydrate K2CO3·H2O ("potash hydrate").  Heating this solid above  gives the anhydrous salt. In an alternative method, potassium chloride is treated with carbon dioxide in the presence of an organic amine to give potassium bicarbonate, which is then calcined:
 2 KHCO3 → K2CO3 + H2O  +  CO2

Applications
 (historically) for soap, glass, and dishware production
 as a mild drying agent where other drying agents, such as calcium chloride and magnesium sulfate, may be incompatible. It is not suitable for acidic compounds, but can be useful for drying an organic phase if one has a small amount of acidic impurity. It may also be used to dry some ketones, alcohols, and amines prior to distillation.
 in cuisine, where it has many traditional uses. It is used in some types of Chinese noodles and mooncakes, as well as Asian grass jelly and Japanese ramen. German gingerbread recipes often use potassium carbonate as a baking agent, although in combination with hartshorn. 
 in the alkalization of cocoa powder to produce Dutch process chocolate by balancing the pH (i.e., reduce the acidity) of natural cocoa beans; it also enhances aroma. The process of adding potassium carbonate to cocoa powder is usually called "Dutching" (and the products referred to as Dutch-processed cocoa powder), as the process was first developed in 1828 by Dutchman Coenraad Johannes van Houten.
 as a buffering agent in the production of mead or wine.
 in antique documents, it is reported to have been used to soften hard water.
 as a fire suppressant in extinguishing deep-fat fryers and various other B class-related fires.
 in condensed aerosol fire suppression, although as the byproduct of potassium nitrate.
 as an ingredient in welding fluxes, and in the flux coating on arc-welding rods.
 as an animal feed ingredient to satisfy the potassium requirements of farmed animals such as broiler breeder chickens.
 as an acidity regulator in Swedish snus snuff tobacco

References

Bibliography
 A Dictionary of Science, Oxford University Press, New York, 2004

External links 
International Chemical Safety Card 1588

Carbonates
Leavening agents
Potassium compounds
Deliquescent substances
Desiccants
Photographic chemicals
Food stabilizers